Ky Dickens is a filmmaker, writer and director best known for her documentaries Zero Weeks, Sole Survivor, The City That Sold America and Fish out of Water.

Early life and education
Dickens was born and raised in Hinsdale, Illinois.  From an early age she always had a camera or camcorder around her neck and would edit footage together by using two VCR's, one to play the tapes and the other to record the edited version.  She decided to devote her life to documentary film making at the age of 16 after a good friend died in car crash and she compiled past footage taken of him.  At Hinsdale Central High School, Ky was student council president her senior year. She was class president her first three years.  She was voted the recipient of the Senior Honor Medal, an award voted on by seniors for the senior most demonstrative of character, service and academics. She graduated magna cum laude with majors in Human and Organizational Development and Sociology from Vanderbilt University.

Career
Dickens' first feature film, Fish Out of Water, explores the seven Bible passages that are most used to condemn homosexuality and same-sex marriage. Dickens talked with ministers on both sides of the debate surrounding homosexuality and the Bible for the film.  Fish out of Water is distributed nationally by First Run Features, and  has been translated into Spanish, Russian, Haitian Creole and Italian. It was acquired by First Run Features in 2009, before it premiered at Outfest.  For her 2013 documentary film Sole Survivor, Dickens contacted 10 of the world's 14 sole survivors of large plane crashes and featured four in the movie.  The documentary follows George Lamson, one of fourteen sole survivors in a commuter plane crash.  Her 2018 documentary, Zero Weeks is about paid family leave, and how the United States is the only developed country in the world that doesn't guarantee paid leave for workers.  Zero Weeks premiered at the Camden International Film Festival and hosted its New York premiere at DOC NYC.  Zero Weeks was screened by a large network of action groups including MomsRising, Family Values at Work  Mi Familia Vota and 9 to 5 in order to create local activism on the issue.  Zero Weeks was screened for members of the US Congress at the DC Naval Museum in April 2018.  Ky's 2019 feature documentary, The City that Sold America, was produced by Emmy Award-winning executive producer Mary Warlick. The film was the sequel to Emmy Award-winning Art & Copy.  The film premiere at the Chicago International Film Festival and hosted its New York Premiere at DOC NYC. The film is about Chicago's impact on American consumer tastes and culture, demonstrating that Chicago gave birth to advertising icons from Ronald McDonald, Jolly Green Giant, The Keebler Elves, Mr. Clean and Tony the Tiger and the Marlboro Man and advertising ideas such as coupons, fast food restaurants, product placement, mail order catalogs and soap operas.  Ky won the FOCUS AWARD for "Achievement in Directing" from Women In Film.  She was a keynote speaker at the Houston Texas Annual Conference for Methodist Ministers in 2010, speaking to her work bringing Fish out of Water throughout the south.  Dickens also directs TV commercials for a wide range of clients.  She has previously been repped by MK Films, Conspiracy and Story.  Her client lists include Hallmark, McDonald's, Tylenol,  Kraft, Wrangler, Revlon and Neutrogena, Wendy's, and Sears.

Awards and recognition
Sole Survivor premiered at Michael Moore's Traverse City Film Festival in 2013, and its New York premier was at DOC NYC in 2013.  It was Indiewire's project of the month in September 2012 and received the Best of the Midwest Award for “Best Feature Film” in November 2013.  It was acquired by CNN Films for broadcast and theatrical worldwide distribution in August 2013, and premiered on the network in January 2014.  In October 2013, Dickens received the Focus Award for “Achievement in Directing” from Women in Film.
Achievement in directing Focus Award
Culture Champion, Game Changer Award 2018
Jury Prize - Best Documentary, BMA Awards.
Jury Prize- Best Documentary, International Women's Film Festival
Jury Prize- Best Documentary Film Editing
Jury prize - Best Documentary, Show Me Justice International Film Festival
Best Feature Film of 2013, Best of the Midwest Awards
Jury Prize - Best Documentary, Reeling International Film Festival
Audience Award, Louisville LGBT Film Festival
Best of Fest Selection, DOC UTAH 2013 
Audience Award Runner Up, Tall Grass Film Festival
Huffington Post - "Top 15 Films to Look Forward to in 2013"
Filmmaker Magazine - "Top 10 Picks for the DOC NYC Film Festival"
PBS POV - "Ten Films to Look Forward to in 2012"
Indiewire - Project of the Month
After Ellen Visibility Prize, Best Festival Release with a lesbian Character (runner-up)
Audience Award, Louisville LGBT Film Festival
Named to New City's "Film 50" List - The 50 artists shaping the film culture in Chicago

Private life
Ky's 2018 film, Zero Weeks, was based on her experience of having a lack of time after the birth of her daughter in 2014.  Ky married furniture designer, Kaisa Dille in 2012. Her son was born in Los Angeles in 2019. After starting her documentary and TV commercial directing career in Chicago, Ky and her family moved to Los Angeles. Her father-in-law, Republican Senator Steven Dille, passed away in March 2020. Ky revered her father-in-law and they had a very close relationship where they talked about social and political ideas. He was a supporter of her documentary work, bringing copies of her film FISH OUT OF WATER to small conservative churches in Minnesota in hopes they'd soften their views on marriages between people of the same gender.

See also
Galaxy Airlines Flight 203
List of sole survivors of aviation accidents and incidents

References

External links
Plane Crashes Since 1970 with a Sole Survivor at airsafe.com.
 
Sole Survivor Official Site
Fish out of Water Official Site
Official Site – Traverse City Film Festival

Year of birth missing (living people)
Living people
LGBT film directors
American directors
Vanderbilt University alumni